Leo Kurauzvione (born 5 December 1981, in Harare) is a retired Zimbabwean footballer.

Kurauzvione played professional football in Zimbabwe and Poland, appearing for Dynamos F.C., Shooting Stars F.C. and Legia Warsaw.

References

 

1981 births
Living people
Zimbabwean footballers
Zimbabwean expatriate footballers
Zimbabwe international footballers
Dynamos F.C. players
Legia Warsaw players
Shooting Stars F.C. (Zimbabwe) players
Zimbabwe Saints F.C. players
Triangle United F.C. players
Association football midfielders
Expatriate footballers in Poland
Zimbabwean expatriate sportspeople in Poland
2004 African Cup of Nations players